Luddendenfoot is a ward and an unparished area in the metropolitan borough of Calderdale, West Yorkshire, England.   It contains 151 listed buildings that are recorded in the National Heritage List for England.  Of these, one is listed at Grade I, the highest of the three grades, two are at Grade II*, the middle grade, and the others are at Grade II, the lowest grade.  The ward contains the villages of Luddenden, Luddenden Foot and Midgley and smaller settlements, and is otherwise largely rural.  After agriculture, its main industry has been textiles, initially this was a domestic industry, and there are remains of the industry in some listed houses, including taking-in doors.  Later came mills, some of which still exist, often now converted for other purposes, and these have been listed.  The largest surviving mill is Oats Royd Mill, and many of its buildings are listed.  The nearby home of its owner, Oats Royd House, is also listed, together with some of its associated structures.  Otherwise most of the listed buildings are houses and associated structures, laithe houses and cottages, farmhouses and farm buildings.  The Rochdale Canal and the River Calder run through the ward, and the listed buildings associated with these are bridges and an aqueduct.  Otherwise, the listed buildings include churches and items in a churchyard, chapels, a public house, a pinfold, a set of stocks, a school, a milepost, and a war memorial.


Key

Buildings

References

Citations

Sources

Lists of listed buildings in West Yorkshire